The 3rd Degree (sometimes written as The Third Degree) is a British quiz show broadcast on BBC Radio 4, hosted by comedian Steve Punt and made by Pozzitive Television. The series is recorded at different universities around the country, the contestants all coming from the university in which the recording takes place. One team consists of three students and the other of three lecturers (known as the "Dons") who teach the subjects the students are studying.

Format
The show consists of several rounds which are as follows:

 The General Knowledge Round: Each team are asked general knowledge questions in turn, which they are allowed to confer on. If they get the question right, they score two points. If they get it wrong the question is thrown over to the other team for a bonus point.
 Specialist Subject Round 1: The first of three specialist subject rounds. The rounds are between one student and the Don who teaches them. The questions are on the academic subject that the student is learning and the Don teaches. The scoring is asymmetric in favour of the student. Correct answers score two points. If a Don gets a question wrong it can go over for a bonus point to the student, but if a student gets a question wrong no bonus is given.
 The List Round: Each team is given 30 seconds to list as many things in a given category (time begins after Punt finishes reading the question). One point is given for each correct answer (indicated by a "ping" sound effect). If eight correct answers are given in the time limit, a ninth bonus point is awarded.
 Specialist Subject Round 2: The second specialist subject round. Follows the same format as the first.
 Highbrow Lowbrow: Referred to by some as the show's "Signature round", here each contestant is given a short clue to a question and are then asked if they want to answer a highbrow or a lowbrow question based on the clue. The students score two points if they get the highbrow question right or one point if they get the lowbrow question right. For the Dons, it is the other way around (one point for highbrow, two points for lowbrow). When the contestant chooses the question, their academic rival has to answer the question not chosen.
 Specialist Subject Round 3: The third and final specialist subject round. Follows the same format as the others.
 The Quick Fire Round: The final general knowledge "bell and buzzer" round (the students have a bell, the Dons have a buzzer). Correct answers score one point. Incorrect interruptions lose one point. Questions are not thrown over to the other side.

Reception

"The 3rd Degree" is one of BBC Radio 4's longest-running quiz shows, and reviews for The 3rd Degree have been generally positive over its eleven year run. Iain Weaver from UKGameshows gave a positive review of the series, saying: "We're not tremendously upset by the way the teachers went through the series unbeaten, they are university lecturers, and university lecturers are meant to know an awful lot. We also liked the way Steve Punt kept the programme flowing at a decent pace, adding jokes and asides, and keeping proceedings moving along most enjoyably. He's probably helped by the audience at the student bar, who have doubtlessly taken this opportunity to have their one pint of something for the week. If there's one slight criticism we'd make, it's that the Highbrow Lowbrow round is a bit of a block in the middle of the programme. We might prefer to split the round into two parts, perhaps shifting the first immediately before the lists round. That would add a little bit more variety, and make the programme a little less imposing. That's just a minor criticism: most of what The 3rd Degree does, it does well. Given that it replaced the venerable Quote... Unquote, it didn't have a high bar, but we can see this programme running for a fair few years."

Awards
In 2015 The 3rd Degree was nominated for the Rose d'Or in the "Radio Game Show" category.

Episodes

Series 1

Series 2

Series 3

Series 4

Series 5

Series 6

Series 7

Series 8

Series 9

Series 10

Series 11

Series 12

See also
 University Challenge

Footnotes

References

External links

2011 radio programme debuts
BBC Radio 4 programmes
British radio game shows
2010s British game shows
Student quiz competitions
Radio game shows with incorrect disambiguation